Lobites is a fossil genus of beetles in the family Buprestidae, containing the following species:

 Lobites granulatus Tillyard & Dunstan, 1923
 Lobites trivittatus Tillyard & Dunstan, 1923
 Lobites tuberculatus Tillyard & Dunstan, 1923

References

Buprestidae genera
Prehistoric beetle genera